Orlando Marques de Almeida Mendes  (Island of Mozambique, 4 August 1916 – Maputo, 11 January 1990) was a Mozambican biologist and  writer.

Biography
He lived the Portuguese decolonisation of Mozambique. In 1944, he moved with his wife and daughter to Coimbra, where he studied biology at the University of Coimbra.

He worked as a biologist in Lourenço Marques and wrote for several publications such as: Tempo, Itinerário, Vértice and África. In spite of being European, he strongly criticized colonial treatment towards black people and Salazar's administration. During the Portuguese Colonial War, he was with FRELIMO nationalist party.

Works
 Trajectórias (1940)
 Clima (1951)
 Carta do capataz da estrada 95 (1960)
 Depois do sétimo dia (1963)
 Portanto, eu vos escrevo (1964)
 Portagem (1966)
 Véspera confiada (1968)
 Um minuto de silêncio (1970)
 Adeus de gutucumbui (1971)
 A fome das larvas (1975)
 País emerso (1975–76)
 Produção com que aprendo (1978)
 Lume florindo na forja (1981)
 Papá Operário mais Seis Histórias (1983)
 Sobre Literatura Moçambicana (1982)

Prizes
 Prémio Fialho de Almeida, 1946

References 
MENDES, O. Sobre Literatura Moçambicana. Maputo: Instituto Nacional do Livro e do Disco, 1982. (Resenha por Russell G. Hamilton, Research in African Literatures, Vol. 17, No. 3, Special Focus on Southern Africa (Outono de 1986), p. 422-425.)

1916 births
1990 deaths
Mozambican writers
Mozambican biologists
20th-century biologists
Mozambican expatriates in Portugal